Diomaténé  is a village and rural commune in the Cercle of Sikasso in the Sikasso Region of southern Mali. The commune covers an area of 96 square kilometers and includes four villages. In the 2009 census, it had a population of 4,274. The village of Diomaténé, the chef-lieu of the commune, is 11 km north of Sikasso.

References

External links
.

Communes of Sikasso Region